The 2015 New Forest District Council election took place on 7 May 2015 to elect members of New Forest District Council in England. This was on the same day as other local elections.

The whole Council is re-elected every 4 years

After the election, the composition of the council was:

 Conservative - 58
 Liberal Democrat - 2

Election Summary

Ward results

Ashurst, Copythrone South & Netley Marsh

Barton

Bashley

Becton

Boldre & Sway

Bramshaw, Copythorne North and Minstead

Bransgore & Burley

Brockenhurst & Forest South East

Buckland

Butts Ash & Dibden Purlieu

Dibden & Hythe East

Downlands and Forest

Fawley, Blackfield & Langley

Fernhill

Fordingbridge

Forest North West

Furzedown & Hardley

Holbury & North Blackfield

Hordle

Hythe West and Langdown

Lymington Town

Lyndhurst

Marchwood

Milford

Milton

Pennington

Ringwood East & Sopley

Ringwood North

Ringwood South

Totton Central

Totton East

Totton North

Totton South

Totton West

References

2015 English local elections
May 2015 events in the United Kingdom
2015
2010s in Hampshire